Vestkanten may refer to:
Vestkanten was a free newspaper in Oslo (now called Lokalavisen Frogner)
Vestkanten is a shopping centre in Bergen
 The Western part of Oslo